Maffra West Upper is a locality in Victoria, Australia, located on Upper Maffra Road, north west of Maffra, in the Shire of Wellington.

Upper Maffra West Post Office opened on 25 July 1887, was renamed Maffra West Upper in 1889 and closed in 1966.

References

Towns in Victoria (Australia)
Shire of Wellington